Verano de Escándalo (2007) (Spanish for "Summer of Scandal") was the eleventh  annual Verano de Escándalo professional wrestling show promoted by Asistencia Asesoría y Administración (AAA). The show took place on September 16, 2007 in Guadalajara, Jalisco, Mexico. The Main event featured a Domo De La Muerte cage match (Dome of Death) match where the last person in the cage would have his hair shaved off. The participants were the team of "Los Hell Brothers" (Charly Manson, Chessman, Cibernético) along with El Zorro taking on the Black Family (Dark Cuervo, Dark Escoria, Dark Espíritu and Dark Ozz).

Production

Background
First held during the summer of 1997 the Mexican professional wrestling, company Asistencia Asesoría y Administración (AAA, or Triple A; Spanish for "Assistance, Consulting, and Administration") began holding a major wrestling show during the summer, most often in September, called Verano de Escándalo ("Summer of Scandal"). The Verano de Escándalo show was an annual event from 1997 until 2011, then AAA did not hold a show in 2012 and 2013 before bringing the show back in 2014, but this time in June, putting it at the time AAA previously held their Triplemanía show. In 2012 and 2013 Triplemanía XX and Triplemanía XXI was held in August instead of the early summer. The show often features championship matches or Lucha de Apuestas or bet matches where the competitors risked their wrestling mask or hair on the outcome of the match. In Lucha Libre the Lucha de Apuetas match is considered more prestigious than a championship match and a lot of the major shows feature one or more Apuesta matches. The 2007 Verano de Escándalo show was the 11th show in the series.

Storylines
The Verano de Escándalo show featured six professional wrestling matches with different wrestlers involved in pre-existing, scripted feuds, plots, and storylines. Wrestlers were portrayed as either heels (referred to as rudos in Mexico, those that portray the "bad guys") or faces (técnicos in Mexico, the "good guy" characters) as they followed a series of tension-building events, which culminated in a wrestling match or series of matches.

Aftermath
After the event it was announced that El Mesias has suffered an injury during the AAA World Title match, which forced the disqualification ending instead of the originally planned ending. El Mesias was out of action for over a month, receiving physical therapy for his Sciatica, but was not stripped of the title during his inactivity.

Results

Order of escape

References

General sources

Specific references

2007 in professional wrestling
Verano de Escándalo
2007 in Mexico